The Schwülme is a river of Lower Saxony and Hesse, Germany.

See also
List of rivers of Lower Saxony
List of rivers of Hesse

References

Rivers of Lower Saxony
Rivers of Hesse
Solling
Bramwald
Rivers of Germany